John D. Sweeney may refer to:

 John David Sweeney, first person to receive a United States Social Security number
 John D. Sweeney, professor of Medieval English at Seton Hall University and father of musician Matt Sweeney
 John D. Sweeney, Democratic candidate for West Virginia's 4th congressional district in the 1926 United States House of Representatives elections